Osvaldoginella phantasia is a species of sea snail, a marine gastropod mollusk, in the family Cystiscidae.

References

phantasia
Gastropods described in 2007